Trap was one of the thirteen shooting events at the 1988 Summer Olympics. It was held on 20 September 1988 at the Taereung International Shooting Range. There were 49 competitors from 28 nations, with each nation having up to four shooters (up from two per nation in prior editions). The event was decided by a shoot-off between Dmitry Monakov of the Soviet Union and Miloslav Bednařík of Czechoslovakia, with Monakov emerging as the winner with 8–7. Frans Peeters of Belgium took bronze after a three-way shoot-off. Monakov's victory was the first gold medal for the Soviet Union in the trap; Czechoslovakia and Belgium each received their first medal in the event as well. Italy's four-Games medal streak ended.

Background

This was the 15th appearance of the men's ISSF Olympic trap event. The event was held at every Summer Olympics from 1896 to 1924 (except 1904, when no shooting events were held) and from 1952 to 2016; it was open to women from 1968 to 1992.

Six of the top 10 shooters from the 1984 Games, including all three medalists, returned: two-time gold medalist Luciano Giovannetti of Italy, silver medalist Francisco Boza of Peru, bronze medalist Daniel Carlisle of the United States, fourth-place finisher Timo Nieminen of Finland, eighth-place finisher Johnny Påhlsson of Sweden, and ninth-place finisher Sherif Saleh of Egypt. The favorites in the event were the last two World Champions, Miloslav Bednařík of Czechoslovakia (1985 and 1986) and Dmytro Monakov of the Soviet Union (1987).

The People's Republic of China and Saudi Arabia each made their debut in the event. Great Britain made its 14th appearance, most among nations, having missed only the 1980 Moscow Games.

Competition format

For the first time since 1956, the trap competition consisted of multiple rounds. The total for finalists also increased, from 200 to 225. 

The qualifying round consisted of six series of 25 shots (150 total). The top 24 shooters advanced to the semifinal. The semifinal featured an additional two series of 25 shots (50 total for the semifinal), with the score added to the qualifying round score for a 200-target semifinal total. The top 6 shooters at that point moved on to the final. One additional series of 25 targets was used for the final, with a total score out of 225. Shoot-offs were used as necessary to break ties for medals.

Records

Prior to this competition, the existing world and Olympic records were as follows. 

Dmitry Monakov and Miloslav Bednařík set the initial 225-target Olympic record at 222.

Schedule

All times are Korea Standard Time adjusted for daylight savings (UTC+10)

Results

Qualifying round

Semifinal

Final

References

Sources

Shooting at the 1988 Summer Olympics
1988 Trap
Trap at the Olympics